Al-Yamanyah al-Sufla is a sub-district located in Jihanah District, Sana'a Governorate, Yemen. Al-Yamanyah al-Sufla had a population of 16850 according to the 2004 census.

References 

Sub-districts in Jihanah District